The 2012 Status Athens Open was a professional tennis tournament played on hard courts. It was the fifth edition of the tournament which was part of the 2012 ATP Challenger Tour. It took place in Athens, Greece between 7 and 13 May 2012.

Singles main-draw entrants

Seeds

 1 Rankings are as of April 30, 2012.

Other entrants
The following players received wildcards into the singles main draw:
  Theodoros Angelinos
  Konstantinos Economidis
  Alexandros Jakupovic
  Markos Kalovelonis

The following players received entry from the qualifying draw:
  Ilija Bozoljac
  Aliaksandr Bury
  Riccardo Ghedin
  Nikolaus Moser

Champions

Singles

 Marinko Matosevic def.  Ruben Bemelmans, 6–3, 6–4

Doubles

 Andre Begemann /  Jordan Kerr def.  Gerard Granollers /  Alexandros Jakupovic, 6–2, 6–3

External links
Official Website

Status Athens Open
Status Athens Open
2012 in Greek tennis